Raymond Leslie Armes (born 27 December 1951) is a British former auto racing driver and businessman.

Career
He is best known for competing in the British Touring Car Championship. In 1989 he finished third in class and twelfth overall, despite only competing for half the season. Armes drove a PG Tips-sponsored class D Honda Civic Si, built by Trakstar Motorsport. In 1990, he continued with the Civic, running in the new super touring class, but could not repeat his form of the previous year, and he departed  the series at the end of the season.

He has also competed in the Rover GTi Championship, National Saloon Car Cup, Volkswagen Vento VR6 Challenge, the Porsche Cup, and the MGF Cup. In 1997 he competed in the opening three rounds of the British GT Championship for Lucent Millennium with a Marcos LM600 alongside Nick Carr.

He was chairman of marketing agency Vibrandt, famously revamping the classic Heinz Tomato Ketchup  label before later leaving the company to establish and become CEO of advertising consultancy Touch of Mojo, whose clients include Unilever and Clark's shoes. The company sponsored the Volkswagen Golf championship in 2013.

Racing record

Complete British Touring Car Championship results 
(key) Races in bold indicate pole position. Races in italics indicate fastest lap (1 point awarded – 1987–1989 in class)

References

External links

Touch of Mojo marketing agency

1951 births
Living people
British Touring Car Championship drivers
English racing drivers
British GT Championship drivers
Place of birth missing (living people)